Hibbertia charlesii is a species of flowering plant in the family Dilleniaceae and is endemic to a restricted part of the south-west of Western Australia. It is a spreading shrub with crowded, upward-pointing linear leaves and golden yellow flowers with five stamens fused at their bases and up to twenty staminodes, all on one side of two densely hairy carpels.

Description
The flowers are sessile and arranged singly on the ends of short side shoots, with leaf-like bracts hidden among woolly hairs. There are five stamens, fused at the base and five to twenty staminodes, all on one side of the two densely hairy carpels that each contain four ovules. Flowering has been recorded in October and November.

Taxonomy
Hibbertia charlesii was first formally described in 2000 by Judith R. Wheeler in the journal Nuytsia from specimens collected by John Stanley Beard in Peak Charles National Park in 1964. The specific epithet (charlesii) refers to Peak Charles, the only place where this species has been collected.

Distribution and habitat
This species has only been recorded from Peak Charles where it grows on granite slopes.

Conservation status
Hibbertia charlesii is classified as "Priority Two" by the Western Australian Government Department of Parks and Wildlife meaning that it is poorly known and from only one or a few locations.

See also
List of Hibbertia species

References

charlesii
Flora of Western Australia
Plants described in 2000